Utricularia uniflora is a terrestrial carnivorous plant that belongs to the genus Utricularia (family Lentibulariaceae). Its distribution ranges across southeastern Australia from extreme southeastern Victoria through New South Wales to southern Queensland. It is also found in Tasmania.

See also 
 List of Utricularia species

References 

Carnivorous plants of Australia
Flora of Queensland
Flora of New South Wales
Flora of Tasmania
Flora of Victoria (Australia)
uniflora
Lamiales of Australia
Plants described in 1810